Scipione Barbò Soncino, or Scipione Barbuo, was a 16th-century Italian jurist and writer, active in Padua. His best-known work was a set of biographies of the Dukes of Milan, Sommario delle vite de' duchi di Milano (Venice, 8vo, 1574; fol. 1584), which was illustrated with engravings by Girolamo Porro.

References
 
 

16th-century Italian jurists
Italian biographers
Male biographers
Italian male non-fiction writers
16th-century Italian writers
16th-century male writers